The Kew International Medal is an award given to individuals who have made a significant contribution to science and conservation.  The award was first established in 1992 by the Board of Trustees of the Royal Botanic Gardens, Kew.

Laureates
Previous award winners include: 

 2022: Elizabeth Maruma Mrema
 2021: Partha Dasgupta
 2020: Sandra Diaz
 2018: Mary Robinson
2017: Juan Manuel Santos
 2016: Sebsebe Demissew
 2015: Kiat Wee Tan
 2014: E. O. Wilson
 2012: Jared Diamond
 2009: Peter H. Raven
 2003: Mary Grierson
 2000: Margaret Stones
 1999: Stella Ross-Craig
 1996: David Attenborough 
 1994: Robert Sainsbury and Lady Lisa Sainsbury

Award criteria and nominations
The winner is ratified by the Executive Board and Board of Trustees. Nominations are received from across the organisation and a selection panel made up of Kew Trustees and Executive Board Members decides the winner. Criteria the panel benchmark against are: 

 Building a world where plants and fungi are understood, valued and conserved – because our lives depend on them
 Providing knowledge, inspiration and understanding of why plants and fungi matter to everyone;
 Helping to solve some of the critical challenges facing humanity including (but not limited to): biodiversity loss, climate change, food security, plant pathogens, fighting disease;
 Increasing public awareness of the threat to plant and fungal diversity.

See also

 List of environmental awards

References

Environmental awards
Awards established in 1992
British science and technology awards
Royal Botanic Gardens, Kew